Hemant Singh (born 5 January 1951) was the Rana of Dholpur from 1954–71, when the all royal titles and privy purses were abolished by Republic of India.

Life
Hemant Singh was born as the second son of Maharaja Pratap Singh Nabha and his wife, Maharani Urmila Devi (1924–1997). When he was three years old, his maternal grandfather, Rana Udaybhanu Singh died, and he was adopted by his maternal grandmother as her late husband's heir. Hemant Singh received his Primary and Senior Secondary education from the Doon School and at completed his Bachelor's of Arts Degree from the Hindu College, Delhi University, in 1971.  He remained the last titular Maharaj Rana of Dholpur from 1954–71, when the all royal titles and privy purses were abolished by Republic of India.

Personal
On 17 November 1972, Rana Hemant Singh married firstly - Vasundhara Raje (8 March 1953-), the third daughter of Maharaja of Gwalior, Shri Jivajirao Scindia and Vijaya Raje Scindia. The couple separated the following year, having had one son- Dushyant Singh who is currently  MP.

Present Life
In 1973, Hemant Singh settled permanently at Panchsheel Marg in Delhi, and on 17 May 2007 he handed over the Dholpur palaces, lands and state jewellery to the care of The State of Rajasthan.

Titles
1951-1954: Maharajkumar Shri Hemant Singh
1954–1971: His Highness Maharajadhiraja Shri Sawai Maharaj Rana Shri Hemant Singh, Lokendra Bahadur, Diler Jang Jai Deo, Maharaj Rana of Dholpur

References

1951 births
The Doon School alumni
People from Rajasthan
Living people
Rulers of Dholpur state